Charles Richard was a design engineer, who designed the collapsible four-tube Rogallo wing used in the experimental NASA Paresev glider. The wing configuration he created was used for manned hung-pilot kite-gliders and was to be found copied only with slight ornamental variation in a decade of hang gliders. Richards was of the Flight Research Center's Vehicle and System Dynamics Branch. The four-beamed wing folded from the noseplate; one of the beams was the spreader beam that kept the flexible-wing's sweep. Those in the following decade copying the Charles Richard wing configuration expanded kiting, hang gliding, ultralight, and trike flight.

Timeline 

 1961 December : Charles Richard is given a directive from NASA's Paul Bikle to build quickly a cheap kite glider that could be used to give pilots practice in flying in free flight using simple weight-shifting that would change the attitude of the wing relative to the hung position of the pilot and payload.
 1962 February 12 : Charles Richard and his team completed a first kite-glider that achieved obtaining an FAA registration. Many versions followed first flight tests.
 2004 Charles Richard name was included in the space Stardust (spacecraft) chip. .

References 

NASA people
American aerospace engineers
Living people
Year of birth missing (living people)